The socavon is a stringed instrument from Panama. It has 4 nylon strings in 4 courses. It is tuned G3, D4, A4, B3.

References
 
 
 

String instruments
Panamanian musical instruments